Thomas Smallwood (1801–1883) was a freedman who worked alongside prominent abolitionist Charles Turner Torrey on the Underground railroad. The two men created what some historians believe was the first branch of the underground railroad that ran through Washington, D.C., which they operated from 1842 to 1844. After their involvement ceased, the network continued to exist in Washington for another two decades. Smallwood also wrote for Torrey's Albany, New York antislavery newspaper, Tocsin of Liberty, as its Washington correspondent.

Biography 
Thomas Smallwood was born a slave in Prince George's County, Maryland in 1801. As a small child, his ownership transferred to Rev. John B. Ferguson, who taught Smallwood to read and write and agreed to set Smallwood free at age 30 in exchange for $500. Smallwood was freed in 1831 and began work in Washington as a shoemaker. For a few years, he also worked as a servant for Mr. John McLeod and his family. From 1822-30, Smallwood was a strong advocate for the African Colonisation Society. However, he was misled on the true beliefs that this society stood for. He believed their goal was to abolish slavery, however, it was the opposite, they wanted to get rid of the free African population by relocating them to Africa.

Smallwood was deeply motivated by the humiliations he experienced as a slave and his Christian beliefs to engage in antislavery activity. Smallwood opposed manumission, or the legal purchasing of slaves to secure their freedom. But his options for bolder action were limited by the fact that he was living in a region of the country controlled by slaveholders.

In Washington, Smallwood worked at the Washington Navy Yard and attended Ebenezer Methodist church on Capitol Hill in the 1820s and 1830s were many employees of the navy yard  worshiped. At Ebenezer, Smallwood and his family found fellowship, and camaraderie and had the opportunity to take part in a progressive and active religious community. Many African Americans during this period found Methodism congenial. Slaves and free people of color took part in adult classes, religious instruction, and gained the opportunity in church sponsored adult classes to learn to write and read scripture. Attendees included a wide range of community leaders including diarist  Michael Shiner, Moses Liverpool, Nicholas Franklin and Sophia Bell all leaders in the African American community. In 1836 Thomas Smallwood was in the same adult class  no.16, as Michael Shiner's wife Phillis.

Then, in early 1842, Smallwood read about Charles Turner Torrey, an antislavery activist who was jailed in Annapolis, Maryland for attempting to report on a legislative convention of Maryland slaveholders. Smallwood became familiarized with Torry through his wife because she worked in his home. Smallwood arranged their introduction. According to Smallwood, Torrey immediately invited him to help plan the escape of a slave family owned by George E. Badger. The North Carolina plantation owner had plans to sell the family down south. But escape plans fell apart when the mother opted to try to raise money for her family's freedom instead.

Smallwood and Torrey proceeded anyway with building an underground railroad network in Washington. They had two places that they collected deposits from for those that they helped travel along the Underground Railroad. This was necessary as he had to pay the teamster’s and any means of conveyances.

The fugitives they secreted north were mostly local slaves whom Torrey or Smallwood met in church, or whom Smallwood met through work at Navy Yard or through the literacy classes he taught. The two men recruited and guided escaped slaves while Smallwood's wife, Elizabeth Smallwood, and his landlady sometimes harbored the fugitives in Smallwood's Washington home. At least once, Captain John H. Goddard, the leader of Washington's police force and de facto antislavery patrol, searched the Smallwood household as a fugitive slave fled out the back door. The pair often paid local black men to assist them. They also relied on the help of a freedman, Jacob Gibbs, who ran an underground network in Baltimore. Smallwood also went to lengths to exclude from their new network people he felt were motivated by profit.

Smallwood and Torrey's first fugitive party was a group of 15 men, women, and children who successfully escaped to Canada. After Torrey relocated to Albany, Smallwood led several more northward escapes by himself. But fears that he was no longer safe from arrest convinced Smallwood to move to Toronto in June 1843. He moved his wife and children to the city that October. Shortly thereafter, Smallwood and Torrey launched their final joint mission, an ill-fated attempt to rescue the families of four escaped black men who approached Smallwood in Toronto. With material support from northern abolitionists such as Thomas Garrett, Torrey and Smallwood met the escapees in Washington. But they narrowly missed capture by Goddard. Smallwood was encountering many obstacles while trying to help slaves and their journey to the North. He became well known to slaveholders; therefore, it was extremely risky for him to stay in the United States, and he was encouraged by Torrey to return to Canada indefinitely

Smallwood fled on foot to Baltimore, where Gibbs helped arrange his return to Toronto. He arrived in Toronto, Canada on December 23, 1843. Smallwood lived the rest of his life in Toronto, where he operated a saw mill and became a prominent member of the city's black leadership. He also expressed opposition to the Refugee Home Society which was created by Henry Bibb because he believed that Blacks should be independent and not take any funds from whites, as well as opposition to the enforcement of segregation.

Family 
Approximately a year after Smallwood was freed, he married Elizabeth Smallwood and they had four children together.

Career and life in Toronto 
From 1846 to his death in 1883, Thomas Smallwood worked many jobs which were captured through the home and city directories in Toronto, Ontario. During this period, he worked in the saw business as a saw sharpener, setter, filer, and dresser. These jobs began on York Street, carried into Queen Street West, and ended on 18 Elizabeth Street. From 1874-78, Smallwood also took on a second job as a bricklayer. Similarly, his son William Smallwood (1861-1927), took on the role as bricklayer in the year of 1874, alongside his father on Chestnut Street.

Death 
Smallwood died of old age in Toronto on May 10, 1883, and was buried in the Toronto Necropolis the following day.

References

1801 births
1883 deaths
Free Negroes
Underground Railroad people